Louis-Paul Neveu (4 July 1931 – 14 December 2017) was a Liberal party member of the House of Commons of Canada. He was an insurance superintendent and life insurance agent by career.

Career
He was first elected at the Shefford riding in the 1965 general election. After his only term in office, the 27th Canadian Parliament, Neveu was defeated in the 1968 election by Gilbert Rondeau of the Ralliement créditiste (later the Social Credit party). Neveu was unsuccessful in subsequent bids for the riding in 1972 and 1974.

References

External links
 

1931 births
2017 deaths
French Quebecers
Members of the House of Commons of Canada from Quebec
Liberal Party of Canada MPs
People from Montérégie